Momcilo or Momčilo (Cyrillic script: Момчило) is a masculine given name of Slavic origin. It is often found in Serbia and Montenegro. It may refer to:

Momčilo Bajagić, Serbian rock musician
Momčilo Bošković (born 1951), retired Serbian footballer
Momčilo Cemović (1928–2001), the President of the Executive Council of the Socialist Republic of Montenegro in 1978–1982
Momčilo Đokić (1911–1983), Serbian football player and manager
Momčilo Đujić (1907–1999), Serbian commander in the Chetnik movement during World War II
Momčilo Gavrić (1906–1993), the youngest soldier in World War I
Momčilo Gavrić (footballer) (1938–2010), Serbian footballer
Momčilo Kapor (1937–2010), Serbian novelist and painter
Momčilo Krajišnik (born 1945), Bosnian Serb politician convicted of murder and crimes against humanity during the Bosnian war (1992–1995)
Momčilo Nastasijević (born 1894), Serbian poet, novelist and dramatist
Momčilo Ninčić (1876–1949), Serbian politician and economist, president of the League of Nations (1926–27)
Momčilo Perišić (born 1944), Serbian general; Chief of the General Staff of the Yugoslav Army until 1998
Momčilo Rajin (born 1954), Serbian art and music critic
Momčilo Spremić (born 1937), Serbian historian and member of the Serbian Academy of Science and Arts
Momcilo Stojanovic (1947–2010), NASL and Canadian international soccer forward
Momčilo Tapavica (born 1872), Serbian tennis player, weightlifter, wrestler and architect
Momčilo Vukotić (born 1950), Serbian football manager and a former player
Momčilo Vuksanović (born 1955), Montenegrin educator and Serb minority leader

See also
Tombstones of Duke Momčilo, group of three medieval tombstones about southeast of Teslić in Bosnia and Herzegovina
Momchil
Momčilović
Staro Momčilovo
Novo Momčilovo

Slavic masculine given names
Serbian masculine given names